David Norris may refer to:

Sports
 David Norris (diver) (1920–1972), Australian diver
 Dave Norris (athlete) (born 1939), New Zealand athlete
 David Norris (cricketer) (born 1946), English cricketer
 David Norris (speedway rider) (born 1972), former British international speedway rider
 David Norris (footballer) (born 1981), English footballer
 Bud Norris or David Norris (born 1985), American baseball player
 David Norris (skier) (born 1990), American cross country skier in the 2019–20 Tour de Ski

Other people
 David Norris (Royal Navy officer) (1875–1937), British admiral
 David Norris (politician) (born 1944), Irish senator, civil rights activist, James Joyce scholar and former presidential candidate
 David Owen Norris (born 1953), British pianist and broadcaster
 David Norris, convicted of the murder of Stephen Lawrence
 David Norris, protagonist in The Adjustment Bureau